Skal Labissière (born March 18, 1996) is a Haitian professional basketball player for the Capitanes de Ciudad de México of the NBA G League. He graduated from Lausanne Collegiate School in Memphis, Tennessee, before playing one season of college basketball for Kentucky. Labissière has also played for the Sacramento Kings and Portland Trail Blazers.

Early years
Labissière was born in Port-au-Prince in Haiti. During the 2010 Haiti earthquake, his family's home collapsed with Labissière, his mother and his brother inside. All three survived but remained trapped under debris for three hours. His legs were pinned, causing them to go numb, and Labissière was unable to walk for a few weeks after. A few months following the earthquake, Labissière moved to Memphis, Tennessee, to live with Gerald Hamilton, who ran the Reach Your Dream Foundation that brings international athletes to the United States as young prospects.

High school career
Labissière attended Evangelical Christian School in Memphis and started to play varsity basketball as an eighth-grader. When he had first arrived, Labissière spoke little English and required a French interpreter in all of his classes. After three to four months, he didn't need the help and became fluent. In 2014, he left the school his senior year and enrolled at Lausanne Collegiate School, also located in Memphis, but because of the move he was ruled by TSSAA as ineligible to play basketball at Lausanne for the season. Instead, Labissière played for Hamilton's Reach Your Dream Prep Academy team, where he averaged 26 points, 12 rebounds and 4.5 blocks per game.

College career

Labissière was rated as a five-star recruit, and was considered among the best players in his class. He committed to the University of Kentucky (UK) to play college basketball. UK's coach, John Calipari, offered Labissière a scholarship before any other 2015 prospect, comparing him to Anthony Davis. At the start of the season, he was considered a potential number 1 draft pick for the 2016 NBA draft. Labissière posted averages of 6.6 points (.516 FG%, .661 FT%), 3.1 rebounds, 1.6 blocks and 15.8 minutes per game in all 36 games while starting 18 of them for the 2015–16 Kentucky Wildcats.

On April 5, 2016, Labissière declared for the NBA draft, forgoing his final three years of college eligibility.

Professional career

Sacramento Kings (2016–2019)
On June 23, 2016, Labissière was selected by the Phoenix Suns with the 28th overall pick in the 2016 NBA draft, becoming the highest drafted Haitian player since Samuel Dalembert (26th overall in 2001). His rights were later traded to the Sacramento Kings on draft night, and on July 15, he signed his rookie scale contract with the Kings. Labissière made his NBA debut on November 5, 2016, recording eight points and three rebounds in 15 minutes off the bench in a 117–91 loss to the Milwaukee Bucks. On February 23, 2017, in just his ninth game of the season, Labissière had a season-high 12 points in a 116–100 win over the Denver Nuggets. On March 1, 2017, in his first career start, Labissière had 10 points and five rebounds in 15 minutes in a 109–100 loss to the Brooklyn Nets. On March 15, 2017, he scored 21 of his career-high 32 points in the fourth quarter of the Kings' 107–101 win over Phoenix, becoming the first rookie from the 2016 draft class to score at least 30. He also had 11 rebounds to record his first career double-double. He became the youngest Kings player to record a 30-10 game and the fourth Kings player to do it as a reserves since the 1984–85 season. His points total was the highest for a Kings first-year player since teammate Ben McLemore scored 31 in 2013–14. Labissière became only the 41st player in NBA history to score at least 32 points while age 20 or younger—the only other player to achieve this feat in franchise history is Tyreke Evans. During his rookie season, he had multiple assignments with the Reno Bighorns of the NBA Development League.

On December 5, 2017, Labissière was assigned to the Reno Bighorns. He was recalled by the Kings four days later. On January 2, 2018, Labissière recorded 17 points and a career-best 15 rebounds in a 131–111 loss to the Charlotte Hornets. On January 22, 2018, he scored a season-high 23 points in a 112–107 loss to Charlotte.

Portland Trail Blazers (2019–2020)
On February 7, 2019, Labissière was traded to the Portland Trail Blazers for Caleb Swanigan. On April 10, Labissière started the season finale for Portland as the team was resting its rotation players for the playoffs. In 40 minutes of action, Labissière had 29 points and 15 rebounds, helping the Blazers overcome a 28-point deficit in a 136–131 win.

On February 6, 2020, Labissière and cash considerations were traded to the Atlanta Hawks for a future protected second-round draft pick. At the end of the season, Labissière did not re-sign with Atlanta, and became a free agent.

Westchester Knicks (2021)
On December 9, 2020, Labissière signed with the New York Knicks. He was waived two days later. He was then added to the Knicks’ NBA G League affiliate, the Westchester Knicks. He made his Westchester debut on February 10, 2021.

Cangrejeros de Santurce (2022)
Labissière joined the San Antonio Spurs for the 2021 NBA Summer League.

On March 10, 2022, Labissière signed with Cangrejeros de Santurce of the Baloncesto Superior Nacional.

Capitanes de Ciudad de México (2023–present)
On March 3, 2023, Labissière was acquired by the Capitanes de Ciudad de México.

Career statistics

NBA

Regular season

|-
| style="text-align:left;"|
| style="text-align:left;"|Sacramento
| 33 || 12 || 18.5 || .537 || .375 || .703 || 4.9 || .8 || .5 || .4 || 8.8
|-
| style="text-align:left;"|
| style="text-align:left;"|Sacramento
| 60 || 28 || 20.7 || .448 || .353 || .805 || 4.8 || 1.2 || .4 ||.8 || 8.7
|-
| style="text-align:left;" rowspan="2"|
| style="text-align:left;"|Sacramento
| 13 || 0 || 8.7 || .433 || .364 || .545 || 1.8 || .5 || .2 || .2 || 2.8
|-
| style="text-align:left;"|Portland
| 9 || 1 || 7.0 || .684 || 1.000 || .500 || 2.1 || .6 || .3 || .3 || 3.4
|-
| style="text-align:left;"|
| style="text-align:left;"|Portland
| 33 || 1 || 17.2 || .551 || .231 || .758 || 5.1 || 1.3 || .2 || .9 || 5.8
|- class="sortbottom"
| style="text-align:center;" colspan="2"|Career
| 148 || 42 || 17.5 || .492 || .353 || .748 || 4.5 || 1.0 || .4 || .7 || 7.2

Playoffs

|-
| style="text-align:left;"|2019
| style="text-align:left;"|Portland
| 3 || 0 || 3.7 || .250 || .000 || .000 || .0 || .0 || .0 || .0 || .7
|- class="sortbottom"
| style="text-align:center;" colspan="2"|Career
| 3 || 0 || 3.7 || .250 || .000 || .000 || .0 || .0 || .0 || .0 || .7

College

|-
| style="text-align:left;"|2015–16
| style="text-align:left;"|Kentucky
| 36 || 18 || 15.8 || .516 || .000 || .661 || 3.1 || .3 || .3 || 1.6 || 6.6

References

External links

 Kentucky Wildcats bio

1996 births
Living people
Basketball players from Memphis, Tennessee
Capitanes de Ciudad de México players
Centers (basketball)
Haitian expatriate basketball people in the United States
Haitian men's basketball players
Kentucky Wildcats men's basketball players
Lausanne Collegiate School alumni
National Basketball Association players from Haiti
Parade High School All-Americans (boys' basketball)
Phoenix Suns draft picks
Portland Trail Blazers players
Power forwards (basketball)
Reno Bighorns players
Sacramento Kings players
Sportspeople from Port-au-Prince
Stockton Kings players
Westchester Knicks players
Haitian expatriate sportspeople in Puerto Rico
Cangrejeros de Santurce basketball players